Tekeste Baire ( – 6 October 2022) was an Eritrean activist who served as the Secretary-General of the National Confederation of Eritrean Workers. He was first elected to this position in 1994 when the pre-independence National Union of Eritrean Workers was transformed into the NCEW.

References

1950s births
Year of birth missing
2022 deaths
Eritrean activists
Trade unionists